The Mirage 33 is a Canadian sailboat, that was designed by American Robert Perry and first built in 1982.

The Mirage 33 design was developed into the Mirage 35 in 1983, by fitting a reverse transom to the design, which adds  to the length overall.

Production
The boat was built by Mirage Yachts in Canada, but it is now out of production.

Design
The Mirage 33 is a small recreational keelboat, built predominantly of fibreglass. It has a masthead sloop rig, an internally-mounted spade-type rudder and a fixed fin keel. It displaces  and carries  of ballast.

See also
List of sailing boat types

Related development
Mirage 35

Similar sailboats
Abbott 33
Alajuela 33
Arco 33
C&C 3/4 Ton
C&C 33
C&C 101
C&C SR 33
Cape Dory 33
Cape Dory 330
CS 33
Endeavour 33
Hans Christian 33
Hunter 33
Hunter 33-2004
Hunter 33.5
Hunter 333
Hunter 336
Hunter 340
Marlow-Hunter 33
Moorings 335
Nonsuch 33
Tanzer 10
Viking 33
Watkins 33

References

Keelboats
1980s sailboat type designs
Sailing yachts
Sailboat type designs by Robert Perry
Sailboat types built by Mirage Yachts